Marie Seong-Hak Kim is a historian and jurist. She is known for her work of comparing European and East Asian legal history, with emphasis on the sources of law, legal theories, and court practices.

Early life and education 
Kim was born in Seoul, South Korea. Her father, was a justice of the Supreme Court of Korea from 1973 through 1980. She graduated from Ewha Woman's University in Seoul. She received her Ph.D. from the University of Minnesota, where she worked under Paul W. Bamford and James D. Tracy. She also earned her J.D. from the University of Minnesota Law School.

Scholarship 
Kim's Law and Custom in Korea: Comparative Legal History (2012) was the first study that comprehensively examined Korean legal history in comparison with European legal history, with particular focus on customary law. A reviewer remarked that the book was far more than a presentation on Korean law and that it instead provided a “more general reflection on the development of customary law in the colonial context”. It demonstrated, as observed by another reviewer, that “there is more than one way of approaching the role of law in the construction of empire (and of empire in the construction of law)”. Her book revised the dominant view in historiography that premodern Korea had a system of private law in the form of customary law. Kim credited Jérôme Bourgon's work in Chinese law for this insight. She has argued that the concept of custom in the legal meaning of the term in East Asia was constructed by the Meiji legal elites in the late nineteenth and early twentieth centuries as they tried to facilitate the transplant of European civil law to Japan. This imported notion of custom as law spread to China and Korea, serving as an intermediary regime between tradition and the demands of modern civil law. Japanese law had profound influence throughout East Asia, in particular in Korea which was a Japanese colony (1910 – 1945).

Kim's Constitutional Transition and the Travail of Judges: The Courts of South Korea (2019) was a study of the evolution of the judicial process and jurisprudence in modern South Korea, seen against the backdrop of the country's political and constitutional vicissitudes. This work was also comparative in its core, contextualizing constitutional authoritarianism in the twentieth century, including Weimar Germany and Latin America. Her investigation into and interpretation of judicial travails in the 1970s under the Yusin Constitution brought “the South Korean case into the general discussions of authoritarian legalism and of transitional justice taking place around the world”.

Originally trained as a sixteenth-century French historian, Kim has continued writing on French legal history. Her 2010 article on Michel de L’Hôpital, chancellor of France from 1560 through 1568 during the French Religious Wars, and early modern French law was the subject of a LHR Forum in Law and History Review.

A central conceptual framework in her research is the role of customary law in the formation of modern states. "Kim relies on H. Patrick Glenn’s (1940–2014) evolutionary stages of custom in Europe: capture, reconstruction and marginalisation” and has applied them to her analysis of East Asian law, showing “how a comparative legal historical approach can be executed in a fruitful manner and, moreover, how it can help to cross not only the confines of time and space but also the confines of legal cultures." She has argued that the codification of customs was a recurring pattern in the process of receiving outside law, as witnessed across history from medieval France (receiving Roman law) to Meiji Japan (embracing European civil law) to colonial scenes (transplanting metropolitan law). Her book, Custom, Law, and Monarchy: A Legal History of Early Modern France (2021), reinforced the foundation of her work in customary law. 

Kim's political and jurisprudential approach to law has been contrasted to that of more culturally attuned historians.  Described as “primarily a lawyer's history”, her writings focusing on politics and state legal institutions depart from the dominant trend, of late, of social and cultural history of law. Her scholarship has been noted as “a comparative law study that is unique for its kind to date.” Alan Watson stated in 2012 that Kim's book, Law and Custom in Korea, “is the best law book I have read in several years.”

Fellowships and Grants 
She was a Fellow at several research institutes in Europe, including the Collegium de Lyon (2011–2012), the Netherlands Institute for Advanced Study (2013–2014), the Freiburg Institute for Advanced Studies (EURIAS and Marie Curie Fellow of the European Union) (2016–2017), and Käte Hamburger Kolleg "Recht als Kultur" at the University of Bonn (2019). She is the recipient of the Fulbright Senior Scholar Grant, the National Endowment for the Humanities Fellowship, and the Social Science Research Council Abe Fellowship

Works

Monographs 
 Custom, Law, and Monarchy: A Legal History of Early Modern France (Oxford: Oxford University Press, 2021, 304 pages). ISBN 9780192845498
 Constitutional Transition and the Travail of Judges: The Courts of South Korea (Cambridge: Cambridge University Press, 2019, 388 pages). ISBN 9781108474894
 Law and Custom in Korea: Comparative Legal History (Cambridge: Cambridge University Press, 2012, 384 pages). ISBN 9781107006973
 Michel de L'Hôpital: the Vision of a Reformist Chancellor during the French Religious Wars (Kirksville: Truman State University Press, Sixteenth Century Essays & Studies, vol. 36, 1997, 216 pages). ISBN 0940474387

Edited volume 
 The Spirit of Korean Law: Korean Legal History in Context (Leiden: Brill | Nijhoff, 2016, 279 pages). ISBN 9789004290778

Personal life 
Kim lives in Minneapolis, Minnesota. She is married and has two sons. She is a member of the Minnesota Bar.

References 

1958 births
Living people
Legal historians
21st-century American historians
American women historians
South Korean historians
South Korean women historians
Korean jurists
American legal scholars
Historians of France
Historians of Korea
Historians of Japan
University of Minnesota Law School alumni
Ewha Womans University alumni
South Korean emigrants to the United States
Lawyers from Minneapolis